Jayde Matthew Herrick (born 16 January 1985) is an Australian cricketer who plays for Victoria in Australian domestic cricket. He is a right-arm fast-medium bowler and a right-hand batsman.

In November 2010, Herrick made his First-class cricket debut for Wellington in a New Zealand domestic match and then the following month played for Victoria in a match against England. He impressed, making 40 runs from just 19 balls in the second innings and by taking the wickets of Eoin Morgan and Paul Collingwood.

Herrick made a remarkable Sheffield Shield debut for Victoria in March 2011. Playing against South Australia, he claimed match bowling figures of 6/115 from 36 overs. Batting at number 11, he was also part of a crucial 85-run partnership with Steve Gilmour. In that partnership, Herrick contributed 43 from 55 balls.

He signed with the Melbourne Renegades in the newly formed Big Bash League for the 2011–12 season.

References

External links

Living people
1985 births
Cricketers from Melbourne
Australian cricketers
Victoria cricketers
Wellington cricketers
Melbourne Renegades cricketers